St. Just is a barrio in the municipality of Trujillo Alto, Puerto Rico. A newer barrio,  its population is counted starting with the 2000 Census, and in 2010 was 14,635.

See also

 List of communities in Puerto Rico

References

Barrios of Trujillo Alto, Puerto Rico